A deputy prime minister or vice prime minister is, in some countries, a government minister who can take the position of acting prime minister when the prime minister is temporarily absent. The position is often likened to that of a vice president, as both positions are "number two" offices, but there are some differences.

The states of Australia and provinces of Canada each have the analogous office of deputy premier. In the devolved administrations of the United Kingdom, an analogous position is that of the deputy First Minister, albeit the position in Northern Ireland has equivalent powers to the First Minister differing only in the titles of the offices. In Canada, the position of deputy prime minister should not be confused with the Canadian deputy minister of the prime minister of Canada, a nonpolitical civil servant position.

In Austria and Germany, the officeholder is known as vice-chancellor.

A deputy prime minister traditionally serves as acting prime minister when the prime minister is temporarily absent or incapable of exercising power. The deputy prime minister is often asked to succeed to the prime minister's office following the prime minister's sudden death or unexpected resignation, but that is not necessarily mandated by the constitution. This government position is often a job that is held simultaneously with another ministry, and is usually given to one of the most senior or experienced ministers of the cabinet. The holder of this office may also be deputy leader of the governing party, or perhaps the leader of the junior party of a coalition government.

Little scholarly attention has focused on deputy prime ministers, as they are sometimes less involved in the political power plays of government and more focus on the work at hand. A 2009 study in Political Science identified nine 'qualities' of deputy prime ministership: temperament; relationships with their Cabinet and caucus; relationships with their party; popularity with the public; media skills; achievements as deputy prime minister; relationship with the prime minister; leadership ambition; and method of succession.

By contrast, the structure of the Government of Russia and Cabinet of Ministers of Ukraine provides for several deputy prime ministers or vice prime ministers. In the case of the Russian government, the prime minister is responsible for defining the scope of the duties for each of their deputies, who also may head a specific ministry: e.g. the former Minister of Finance of Russia, Alexey Kudrin, also serves as one of the deputies of the prime ministers or vice-premiers. One or two of these deputy prime ministers may hold the title of a first deputy prime minister. Russian federal law indicates that in accordance with the order established in advance, one of the deputy prime ministers may temporarily substitute for the prime minister in their absence. Customarily, however, it is to one of the "first" Deputy prime ministers that the prime-ministerial duties may be delegated. At the same time, in the case of prime minister's resignation, the law allows the President of Russia to choose any of the current vice-premiers to serve as an acting prime minister until the confirmation of the new government.

There is also the special case of Belgium: in the Federal Government of Belgium, a deputy prime minister not only replaces the prime minister in the case they are incapacitated, but also acts as the link between the government and their political party. In short, in Belgium, a Deputy prime minister is the voice of their political party in the federal government, and they are the voice of the government in their political party. The prime minister and the deputy prime ministers form what is called the "inner cabinet" (kernkabinet; conseil des ministres restreint or kern), an instance where the most important political decisions are discussed and taken.

Lists of deputy prime ministers

Position abolished

 Deputy to the Prime Minister of Norway
 Deputy Prime Minister of Bangladesh
 Deputy Prime Minister of Suriname
 Deputy Prime Minister of Indonesia
 Deputy Prime Minister of Turkey
 Deputy Prime Minister of Zimbabwe

References

 
Government occupations
Vice offices